David Alphonso Talboys (c. 1790–1840) was an English bookseller, known as a publisher, translator, and local politician.

Life
Born about 1790, Talboys established himself as a bookseller in Bedford. He subsequently moved his business to Oxford, where he became known for his knowledge of the book trade. In 1823 he went into partnership with James Luff Wheeler, the university bookseller, who married his daughter Anne Ophelia. Talboys & Wheeler then began to publish the "Oxford English Classics" series, with William Pickering of Chancery Lane, London.

On 1 December 1827 Talboys was admitted to the privileges of a member of Oxford University. He took a leading part in the affairs of the city of Oxford, was a councillor of the east ward, and served the office of sheriff. After the election of 1835, Talboys was seen as the leader of the radical reformers in Oxford municipal affairs; together with Charles Sadler, a moderate reformer, he was able to make some changes in charity organisation. He was then attacked by the Oxford Herald, controlled by Philip Bliss, who attempted to have his business boycotted.

Talboys died at Oxford on 23 May 1840, leaving a widow and seven children.

His son-in-law was the gymnast and fencing master Archibald MacLaren.

Works
Talboys was the author of Oxford Chronological Tables of Universal History, 1835 and 1840. He referenced James Bell's Compendious view of universal history and literature, in a series of tables (1820) and adopted some of the typographical conventions of Bell. Together Bell and Talboys are considered to have innovated influentially, in the use of bold type for cueing, in a way that carried over into textbook design.

Talboys made translations of Arnold Hermann Ludwig Heeren's Researches into the Politics, Intercourse, and Trade of the Carthaginians, Ethiopians, and Egyptians (1832) (from the Ideen of Heeren) and Manual of the Political System of Europe (1834). He translated also Friedrich von Adelung's Historical Sketch of Sanscrit Literature (Oxford, 1832), making additions and corrections.

Notes

Attribution

1790s births
1840 deaths
English publishers (people)
English translators
19th-century British translators
19th-century English businesspeople